Nayman is a village in Nookat District, Osh Region, southwestern Kyrgyzstan. Its population was 1,811 in 2021. Until 2012 it was an urban-type settlement.

Population

References

Populated places in Osh Region